Colletotrichum mangenotii is a fungal plant pathogen.

References

External links

mangenotii
Fungal plant pathogens and diseases
Fungi described in 1952